Laimonis is a Latvian masculine given name, borne by more than 1,800 men in Latvia. The name means "lucky", "happy" or "blessed" and is related to the ancient Latvian word laime ("happiness", "joy" or "luck"), or the goddess Laima.

Laimonis is one of the relatively few names still in modern use from among the many names of Latvian origin revived or invented during the Latvian National Awakening of the late 19th century.

Its nameday is celebrated on 29 October.

Notable people with the name 

 Laimonis Laimins, American microbiologist at Northwestern University
 Laimonis Laizāns (1945–2020), Soviet Latvian football goalkeeper who played for FK Daugava Rīga and Torpedo Moscow

Notes

Sources
 Pilsonības un Migrācijas Lietu Parvalde (PMLP): Office of Citizenship and Migration Affairs personal name database

References
 Latkovskis, Leonards, 1971: Latgalu uzvordi, palames un dzymtas II. Munich: Latgalu izdevniecība 
 Siliņš, K., 1990: Latviešu personvārdu vārdnīca. Rīga: Zinātne 

Latvian masculine given names